Gerrit L. Verschuur (born in 1937 in Cape Town, South Africa) is an American scientist who is best known for his work in radio astronomy. Though a pioneer in that field, Verschuur is also an author (he has written about astronomy, natural disasters, and earth sciences), inventor, adjunct professor of physics for the University of Memphis. Since 1996 he has been the Chief Scientist for Translucent Technologies, LLC; a company which is based in Memphis, Tennessee.

In 1992 Verschuur became a resident of the City of Lakeland, which is located in Shelby County, Tennessee, northeast of Memphis. In 2001 Verschuur was elected, and served a four-year term as commissioner. In 2007 he was elected again and is currently served another term as Commissioner for two years. At present, Verschuur is also the President of the Garner Lake Association. Since 1986 he has been married to Dr. Joan Schmelz, a fellow scientist whose specialty is solar astronomy, specifically coronal loops. Verschuur has one son who lives in England.

Verschuur has taught at the University of Manchester, Rhodes University, the universities of Colorado and Maryland, UCLA, and the University of California, Berkeley, among others. He has been an annual speaker at Mid-South Stargaze, "the annual amateur astronomers conference and star party held at Rainwater Observatory in French Camp, Mississippi." In 1971 Verschuur was hired as the first Director of Fiske Planetarium for the University of Colorado at Boulder, and in 1980 he worked with Dr. John C. Lilly.

In his primary field of study Verschuur "pioneered the measurement of the interstellar magnetic field using the 21-cm Zeeman effect technique." A thing which, according to Virginia Trimble, for the first time allowed astronomers to "measure magnetic strengths and their place-to-place variations with some confidence."

Biography

Gerrit L. Verschuur was born in 1937 in Cape Town, South Africa, at the foot of Table Mountain. In 1936, his parents had emigrated from the Netherlands and settled in Cape Town. Two years after he was born—in 1939—his parents moved again, choosing a suburb of Cape Town named Lakeside. While he was living there, Verschuur attended  Muizenberg Junior School. Then, when his parents moved to Port Elizabeth in 1950, he attended Grey Junior and subsequently Grey High School.

After graduation he began a six-year stint at Rhodes University in Grahamstown where he earned a BSc in 1957—Majors: Math, Physics, & Applied math; a BSc (Hons) of Physics in 1958; and a MSc degree of physics, in 1960.

In December 1960 he sailed for Southampton, England on Capetown Castle, a ship owned by the Union Castle Line. It was one of the last passenger mail boats to ply the SA-England route, but was sold for scrap in 1967.

Current research

Verschuur is at the center of a recent debate over the age of the universe. He claims that images from the Wilkinson Microwave Anisotropy Probe are not pictures of the universe in its early form, but rather hydrogen gas clouds in our own galaxy. If he is shown to be correct, much work relating to the Big Bang theory would be undermined.

On December 10, 2007, his work with respect to COBE, WMAP, and HI, was published in The Astrophysical Journal. However, in a more systematic examination of the maps published that same year in The Physical Review, Land and Slosar
 find the data do not support the correlation claimed by Verschuur.

Selected publications

Books
 The Invisible Universe: The Story of Radio Astronomy. Springer-Verlag, New York, 1974"Nominated for National book award – then disqualified because I was not a US citizen at the time."
 Galactic and Extragalactic Radio Astronomy. Springer-Verlag, New York, 1974. Co-edited with K.I. Kellerman
Cosmic Evolution: An Introduction to Astronomy. Houghton Mifflin, 1978. Co-Author with George B. Field and Cyril Ponnamperuma
Starscapes.Little Brown & Co., Boston, 1977
Cosmic Catastrophes. Addison Wesley Longman Publishing Co., 1978
Interstellar Matters: Essays on Curiosity and Astronomical Discovery. Springer-Verlag, 1989 
Hidden Attraction: The History and Mystery of Magnetism. Oxford University Press, 1996, (First Published 1993) 
Impact!: The Threat of Comets and Asteroids. Oxford University Press, 1996 
The Invisible Universe: The Story of Radio Astronomy. Springer, 2nd. ed., 2007

Encyclopaedia Articles
"Interstellar Medium" Encyclopædia Britannica (15th edition) Volume I-J. pp 790–800, 1973
"Interstellar Matter" Encyclopædia Britannica (Asian edition) 1986
"Magnetic Fields and Galactic Structure." Reference Encyclopedia of Astronomy and Astrophysics. Ed. S. Maran, Van Nostrand Rheinhold, New York, 1992

References

American astronomers
1937 births
Living people